Psaltoda flavescens, commonly known as the golden knight, is a species of cicada native to Queensland in eastern Australia.

References

External links

Hemiptera of Australia
Insects described in 1892
Psaltodini